Sport in Galway includes a diverse heritage, with a history in sports ranging from horse racing, Gaelic games, soccer and rugby to rowing, motorsport, greyhound racing and others. The Galway Races are known worldwide and are the highlight of the Irish horse racing calendar. Over the years it has grown into an annual festival lasting seven days.

Gaelic games

Both hurling and football are strong in Galway city. Pearse Stadium in Salthill is the home to Galway GAA, the county's Gaelic games body. The Galway hurlers compete annually in the All-Ireland Senior Hurling Championship for the Liam MacCarthy Cup.  Despite having won the cup only 5 times in their history, Galway is considered as one of the top teams in the Championship. 

The footballers compete annually in the All-Ireland Senior Football Championship for the Sam Maguire Cup, though being less successful than the hurlers in recent years, the footballers have won the cup 9 times with the most recent being in 2001.

Soccer
Galway United F.C. is based in the city and currently plays in the League of Ireland First Division. The team plays its home games at Eamonn Deacy Park. The club was formed in 2013 as a phoenix club under the name Galway F.C and first competed in the 2014 season.

The original incarnation of the club, Galway United (1937-2011), first competed in the League of Ireland since 1977, then known as Galway Rovers. Michael D. Higgins, later elected President of Ireland in 2011, served as a president of the club in a ceremonial capacity. Following struggles with debts, the club became defunct at the end of the 2011 season. The Galway United Supporters Trust (GUST) had been servicing many debts of the company and were able to keep the club afloat for the 2011 season, with it having been effectively abandoned by its directors. GUST withdrew their support for the team and applied to join the 2012 League of Ireland as a community enterprise, rather than as a private company, which the old club had been. This application was not successful, however.

Galway F.C. was formed the following year from a merger of GUST with representatives of the GFA, and Mervue United and Salthill Devon, two other clubs in the city, who had competed in the First Division since 2009 and 2010 respectively.

Galway United have won the FAI Cup once in 1991 and the League of Ireland Cup twice in 1986 and 1997, making them the regions most successful club at pro/semi pro level.

Rugby
The professional rugby union team for the province, Connacht Rugby, is based in the city. They play in the Pro14 and as of 2014, in the Rugby Challenge Cup. The team plays their home matches at the Galway Sportsgrounds.

Two senior amateur rugby union teams in Galway, Galwegians RFC and Galway Corinthians RFC, play in the All-Ireland League.

In rugby league the Galway Tribesmen have been All-Ireland Champions and in 2022 entered the Challenge Cup.

Individual sports
In 2012 and 2013, the players tour championship grand final of snooker was held at the Bailey Allen Hall in Galway, but the event moved to Preston, England for the 2014 edition.

Golf
There are several golf courses that serve Galway city. Bearna Golf Club, Galway Golf Club, Cregmore Golf Club and Galway Bay Golf Resort are all situated within  of the city centre.

Tennis
The Galway Lawn Tennis Club, in the Salthill area of the city, has facilities for tennis, squash and badminton spread over 22 courts.

Swimming
Nearby Salthill has a 25m competitive swimming pool in the Leisureland complex and three competitive swimming clubs (i) Shark Swimming Club, (ii) Laser Swimming Club and (iii) Galway Swimming Club train there. There is also a handball and racketball club while there are several martial arts clubs throughout the city. There is a 25m pool at NUI, Galway as well as one at Renmore's KingFisher Club.

Sailing/Rowing
Sailing on both sea and lake are popular, as is rowing in the River Corrib with seven clubs providing the necessary facilities and organising rowing competitions. These clubs include: Gráinne Mhaol Rowing Club, Tribesmen Rowing Club, Galway Rowing Club, Coláiste Iognáid ('The Jes') Rowing Club, St Joseph's Patrician College ('The Bish') Rowing Club, NUI Galway Boat Club and Cumann Rámhaiochta Choláiste na Coiribe.

In 2009 Galway hosted a stopover on the Volvo Ocean Race and the city was finishing point of the round-the-world competition in July 2012.

Greyhound Racing
Near the city centre, on College Road, the Sportsground has greyhound races every Thursday, Friday and Saturday night. It was refurbished by the Irish Greyhound Board, Bord na gCon, and the facility is shared with the Connacht rugby team.

Motor Sports
In motorsport, the annual Galway International Rally was the first international rally to be run in the Republic of Ireland in 1971. Throughout its history it has attracted star drivers from all over the world. The 2007 event was won by twice World Rally Champions Marcus Grönholm and Timo Rautiainen. The organisers and promoters of the event is the Galway Motor Club. The club also host Galway Summer Rally since 1978.
The Galway International Rally takes place at the beginning of February, and the Galway Summer Rally at the end of August every year.

Basketball
Moycullen Basketball Club have been a flagship basketball club in Galway for a number of years and currently compete in the Superleague, the top division in Irish basketball. They are the first Galway or Gaeltacht team to ever compete in the Superleague which is a semi-professional league. Between Moycullen and Oranmore/Maree Club numerous Irish youth international players have been produced over the last 10 years, who have represented Ireland at European basketball championships. In 2009, Moycullen's Cian Nihill became the first Galway man to represent Ireland at senior level since Oranmore/Maree's James Burke achieved the same feat 20 years previously. In 2007/2008 Maree won the U-18 men's national cup while Moycullen won the U-20 national title. In the 2010/2011 season Oranmore/Maree Basketball Club's 1991 Men's team retained an undefeated record of over 100 games to go and claim the only National Championship trophy remaining, the  U-20 Men's national cup. Titans Basketball Club and Oranmore/Maree Basketball Club both represent Galway in the national league, Ireland's second highest division.

Hockey
Galway Hockey Club have both men's and ladies' hockey teams with a vibrant youth section and is based at the Regional Sports Centre in Dangan.

Galway Bay Lightning have a gold division team, while NUIG have a silver division team competing in Inline Hockey Ireland's national league.

Aussie Rules
The City's first Aussie Rules Club, the Midwest Magpies were formed in January 2010 and play in the Premiership in the Australian Rules Football League of Ireland. The club has had limited success in its first year, but has already had some of its players selected to play on Ireland's Aussie Rules National Team, the Irish Warriors.

See also
 Galway#Sport

References